Kévin Perrot (born 13 June 1989) is a French professional footballer who plays as full-back for  club Laval.

Career
A native of Laval, Perrot began his professional career in 2010 and made his debut in a 0–0 draw with Ajaccio on 24 September 2010.

On 18 June 2019, it was confirmed that Perrot had joined Le Puy. On 17 June 2021, he returned to Laval.

Honours 
Laval

 Championnat National: 2021–22

References

External links

Kévin Perrot profile at foot-national.com

1989 births
Living people
People from Laval, Mayenne
French footballers
Association football defenders
Stade Lavallois players
Le Puy Foot 43 Auvergne players
Ligue 2 players
Championnat National players
Championnat National 3 players
Sportspeople from Mayenne
Footballers from Pays de la Loire